Sargis Hovhannisyan (born 17 August 1968), is an Armenian football coach and a former defender, who mostly spent his club career at FC Lokomotiv Moscow. He works for Lokomotiv as a scout.

Hovhannisyan was born in Yerevan, Soviet Union.  He was one of the key defenders of the Armenia national football team, and has participated in 16 international matches since his debut on 7 September 1994, in an away match against Belgium.

Achievements
Russian Cup with Lokomotiv Moscow: 1995/96, 1996/97, 1999/00, 2000/01
Russian Cup finalist with Lokomotiv Moscow: 1997/98
Russian Premier League bronze medals with Lokomotiv Moscow: 1998
Russian Premier League runner-up with Lokomotiv Moscow: 1999, 2000

References

External links

Living people
1968 births
Footballers from Yerevan
Soviet footballers
Armenian footballers
Armenia international footballers
Armenian expatriate footballers
Armenian football managers
FC Ararat Yerevan players
FC Dynamo Moscow players
FC Lokomotiv Moscow players
FC Rubin Kazan players
Armenian expatriate sportspeople in Russia
Expatriate footballers in Russia
Soviet Top League players
Russian Premier League players
Association football defenders
Soviet Armenians